Meneau is a surname. Notable people with the surname include: 

Christophe Meneau (born 1968), French volleyball player
Marc Meneau (1943–2020), French chef